José Ricardo Alvarado Alberto (born May 23, 1980, in San Salvador, El Salvador) is a retired Salvadoran professional footballer.

Club career

Second Division years
Alvarado started his career at Municipal de San Salvador, and joined fellow capital outfit Telecom FC in 1997.

He then moved to Coca-Cola and stayed with them for seven years, experiencing their change of name to Independiente Nacional 1906 and the merger with Independiente de San Vicente, which eventually saw them clinch promotion to the Primera División de Fútbol de El Salvador in 2006.

Alvarado only made his debut at the top in El Salvador at 26 years.

Isidro Metapán
In 2007, he signed with Isidro Metapán. With Isidro Metapán, Alvarado won the Apertura 2008, Clausura 2009, Clausura 2010, Apertura 2010 and Apertura 2011. Also he lost the Clausura 2012 final against Águila.

UES
Alvarado signed with UES for the Apertura 2013. His debut was a 2–3 defeat against Isidro Metapán in the Estadio Jorge Calero Suárez. In August 2014, Alvarado scored in a 5–1 victory against Juventud Independiente in the Complejo Municipal de San Juan Opico.

In October 2014, Alvarado scored another goal in a 2–2 draw against FAS in the Estadio Óscar Quiteño.

With the scarlet team, Alvarado experienced an administrative, economic and sports crisis, with severe delays in salary payments. In March 2015, Alvarado announced that he would retire from professional football.

Atlético Marte
However, despite announcing his retirement, Alvarado signed with Atlético Marte for the Apertura 2015 tournament. With the team of San Salvador, Alvarado experienced a sports, economic and institutional crisis. In April 2016, Alvarado left the team. Atlético Marte ended up descending to Segunda División in the Clausura 2016.

International career
Alvarado received his first call up to the national team in December 2008.

He officially received his first cap on February 1, 2009, in a UNCAF Nations Cup match against Honduras (0–1 defeat).

Honours
Primera División de Fútbol de El Salvador: 5
 Apertura 2008, Clausura 2009, Clausura 2010, Apertura 2010, Apertura 2011

References

External links

1980 births
Living people
Sportspeople from San Salvador
Association football central defenders
Salvadoran footballers
El Salvador international footballers
A.D. Isidro Metapán footballers
2009 UNCAF Nations Cup players